Greatest Hits is a compilation of Billy Idol's most popular singles, released by Capitol Records in 2001. The album includes two additional tracks: a live recording of one of his most popular songs, "Rebel Yell" (this live version was recorded in 1993 and appeared as a b-side for the single "Speed" in 1994), plus a new version of Idol's longtime producer Keith Forsey's "Don't You (Forget About Me)". Although Forsey originally wrote the song with Idol in mind, Idol turned it down and eventually the song was given to Simple Minds who would go on to make it a worldwide hit in 1985. Greatest Hits was certified platinum by the RIAA in 2005.

Track listing

Charts

Weekly charts

Year-end charts

Certifications

References

Billy Idol albums
2001 greatest hits albums
Capitol Records compilation albums